Below is a list of results for the Antigua and Barbuda national football team.

Results

References
RSSSF archive of international results
FIFA.com fixtures and results

National association football team results